Oleksandr Volodymyrovych Romanchuk is a Ukrainian football player.

International career
Romanchuk has been capped 3 times so far. He debuted in a friendly match against Israel on 7 February 2007.

Honours
Dynamo Kyiv
 Ukrainian Premier League: 2008–09

Metalist Kharkiv
 Ukrainian Premier League: Runner-Up 2012–13

Ukraine under-21s
 UEFA Under-21 Championship: runner-up 2006

References

External links

Living people
1984 births
Ukrainian footballers
Ukraine international footballers
Ukraine under-21 international footballers
Footballers from Kyiv
Ukrainian Premier League players
FC Arsenal Kyiv players
FC Dynamo Kyiv players
FC Desna Chernihiv players
FC Dnipro players
FC Metalist Kharkiv players
FC Dynamo-2 Kyiv players
FC Vorskla Poltava players
Association football defenders